Jimmy Reid (August 23, 1946 – September 28, 2016) was an American professional pool player. He was given the Lifetime of Pool in Action Award at the One Pocket Hall of Fame banquet in Louisville, Kentucky. His nicknames were "Hippie Jimmy" and "Diamond Jim".

Career
Born in Birmingham, Alabama. Reid was raised in Gloucester, Massachusetts, an old New England fishing port. He frequented the Olympia Billiard Room aka "The Mines", which is where veteran pool players such as Boston Shorty, Bob Ingersol, and "Cuban Joe" Valdez frequented.

He went on the road shooting pool as a teenager during pool's golden years. By the time he entered the Johnston City pool tournaments in Johnston City, Illinois, produced by brothers George and Paulie Jansco in the 1960s, he was playing championship-level pool.  He later connected with Keith McCready in California.

Titles and achievements
 1974 Southwest Open 9-Ball Championship
 1977 Lansing City 9-Ball Championship
 1979 BCA National 8-Ball Tournament
 1980 Las Vegas 8-Ball Classic
 1981 Champagne 9-Ball Open 
 1981 Joe Farhat's 9-Ball Open
 1983 Adrian 9-Ball Open
 1985 U.S. Open 9-Ball Championship
 1988 King of the Rings 9-Ball
 1992 European Open 8-Ball 
 1992 European Open 9 Ball
 1993 European Open 8-Ball
 1993 German Open 9-Ball
 1994 Spring Hill 9-Ball Open
 2008 Lifetime Pool in Action Award

References

American pool players
1946 births
Living people
Sportspeople from Gloucester, Massachusetts